Archibald Hunter (23 September 1859 – 29 November 1894) was a Scottish footballer who was the first captain of Aston Villa to lift the FA Cup, in 1887. He was one of Victorian football's first household names.

Life and career 
Born in Joppa near Ayr, Hunter played for Ayr Thistle and Third Lanark (featuring on the losing side in the 1878 Scottish Cup Final) before signing for Aston Villa in August 1878, four years after their formation. His Aston Villa career began 10 years before the commencement of the first Football League season. In his league career (1888–1890) he played 73 matches scoring 42 goals. Also his 33 goals for Villa in the FA Cup (including 3 in 1888–1889) remains the club record in the competition. Hunter made his League debut on 15 September 1888 at Wellington Road, as a forward, against Stoke. Aston Villa won 5–1 and Hunter scored one of the goals. He missed three League games (out of 22) in 1888–89 and scored seven League goals including one brace.

Despite being one of the greats of the 19th century game, Hunter never fulfilled his dream of playing for Scotland against England. This is because at the time the Scottish Football Association had a policy of not picking 'Anglo-Scots' (i.e. Scots who played in the English League) which persisted until 1896.

Hunter originally came to Birmingham planning to sign for Calthorpe F.C., but was persuaded to sign for Villa instead, ostensibly after hearing of Aston Villa's Scottish connections, although, given Hunter "had become acquainted with the Calthorpe Football Club" when in Scotland, and given Calthorpe had been founded and run by Scots, and played in Scottish colours, this rationale is questionable.  Calthorpe's links with Queen's Park F.C. meant the club was resolutely amateur, unlike Villa.   Hunter later recalled in his memoirs; 

He was idolized by the crowds and became the first player to score in every round of the FA Cup in Villa's victorious 1887 campaign.  

During a League match against Everton in 1890, Hunter suffered a heart attack and collapsed. He never played again, and died in Aston at the age of 35. It is said that on his death-bed he asked to be lifted up one last time to see the crowd going to Perry Barr (then Villa's home).

His brother Andy also played for Villa, and scored their first ever FA Cup goal. Another brother, John, was a Scotland international.

One source said that there was no doubt that the auburn-haired Hunter was a great player – one of the best footballers of the 1880s and 90s. He was an individualist with a commanding personality; he was robust yet decidedly fair and never committed a foul in anger. Known as 'The Old Warhorse', he was a mixture of toughness and cleverness, a player who often ran down the touchline, pulling defenders all over the field.

Legacy 
In 1998, Hunter was inducted into the English Football League's list of 100 legends.

The headstone on his grave reads:

Statistics
Source:

References

External links

1859 births
1894 deaths
Footballers from South Ayrshire
Scottish footballers
Association football forwards
Third Lanark A.C. players
Aston Villa F.C. players
English Football League players
FA Cup Final players